Oshtava is a village in Kresna Municipality, in Blagoevgrad Province, Bulgaria.

References

Villages in Blagoevgrad Province